Talaridris is a genus of ant in the subfamily Myrmicinae containing the single species Talaridris mandibularis.

References

External links

Myrmicinae
Monotypic ant genera